is a Japanese original net animation series adapted from Hideo Furukawa's 2016 translation into modern Japanese of The Tale of the Heike, a 13th-century historical epic depicting the rise and fall of the Taira clan. The series was produced by Science SARU and directed by Naoko Yamada, and released from September 16 to November 25, 2021 on the Japanese streaming service Fuji TV on Demand and on Funimation's streaming service. A Japanese television broadcast on Fuji TV's +Ultra programming block aired from January 13 to March 17, 2022.

Plot
Set during the Genpei War (1180–1185), a devastating civil conflict that divided Japan, the story is told from the perspective of Biwa, a young girl and traveling biwa minstrel.

Following the death of her blind father, Biwa meets Taira no Shigemori, heir to the powerful Taira clan that is fighting for supremacy in the war. Shigemori also has the power of supernatural sight; with one of his eyes he sees ghosts of those killed in the war. Through his ability, he understands his clan's part in the killing of Biwa's father, and when Biwa relates a prophecy predicting the downfall of the Taira clan he believes that she has the same ability. The kind, level headed and responsible Shigemori invites Biwa to come live with him and his family under the auspices of being a playmate and companion for his children, but hopes that her power can prevent the downfall of the Taira clan. Biwa agrees to be taken in, but refuses to use her power to help the clan that was responsible for the death of her father. She serves to chronicle the events leading to the rise and fall of the Taira clan.

Characters

The daughter of a biwa hōshi who is killed by agents of the Taira after Biwa unintentionally insults them. She dresses like a boy and has one green and one brown eye which enables her to see into the future. Her character does not appear in the original epic story.

The eldest son of Kiyomori, the leader of the Taira clan and in contrast to his father, he is level headed and responsible. He holds the posts of Palace Minister and Left Commander. He has four children: Koremori, Sukemori, Kiyotsune and Arimori. He has different colored eyes and can see the spirits of the dead, but is disparagingly referred to as the Lantern Lord because he keeps his household well-lit at night.

Shigemori's half-sister who befriends Biwa. She becomes betrothed to Norihito, son of the Emperor.  Her younger sister Moriko was married to Lord Fujiwara no Motazane (the older brother of Lord Motofusa) at the age of nine. When he died two years later, Moriko inherited his lands, angering Motofusa. 

The leader of the Taira clan. He has become a monk, but still wields power, and his mercurial nature causes problems for the clan and his eldest son and heir, Shigemori. His other children are; Munemori, Tomomori, Tokuko and Shigehira.

Kiyomori's wife.

Shigemori's eldest son.

Shigemori's half-brother.

The 77th emperor of Japan who has a son Norihito.

The 80th emperor of Japan. Go-Shirakawa's son whose personal name is Norihito and who marries Tokuko.

Norihito's mother.

Production
The series was directed by Naoko Yamada, written for television by Reiko Yoshida, and featured music by Kensuke Ushio. The trio previously collaborated on A Silent Voice (2016) and Liz and the Blue Bird (2018) at Kyoto Animation, while Yoshida and Ushio had worked with production studio Science SARU. Hitsujibungaku performed the opening theme "Hikaru Toki" (When the Light Shines), while Ani from Scha Dara Parr and Agraph performed the ending theme "unified perspective".

Episode list

Marketing
In cooperation with Okada Museum of Art, a special art exhibition focusing on both the history of the Genpei War and the production of the series opened on January 2, 2022. The exhibition ran at the museum through February 27.

Reception
Reviewing the series during its streaming release in the United States, anime-focused website Anime News Network featured responses from three reviewers. Analyzing the first six episodes, Rebecca Silverman rated the series with 4 and a half stars, concluding that "it may still be a bit of a confusing story to follow, but it's also one that has survived this many centuries for a reason." In a joint review of the first six episodes, Jean-Karlo Lemus and Monique Thomas praised the series' artistry, complex story, and usage of music, with Lemus concluding "The Heike Story is easily one of the best-looking shows this season" and "this series could touch a lot of fans," and Thomas calling it "an instant classic."

In a review for Japan-based magazine Metropolis, Chris Cimi called the show "a 13th century epic turned modern anime triumph" and wrote that the series "culminates into something exceedingly rare in the modern landscape of Japanese animation as a business; a show worth watching, no matter where you fall on the anime divide."

Reviewing the series during its Japanese television release, Kenichiro Horii of Yahoo! Japan praised the series, writing that "The Tale of the Heike, one of Japan's treasures, has been transferred into a beautiful image, including its spirit. The anime The Heike Story is a work that has the potential to become a new Japanese treasure."

Following the conclusion of its streaming release, The Heike Story was named one of the best series of 2021 by Anime News Network, Paste Magazine, Comic Book Resources, /Film, the editorial staff of Crunchyroll, and Polygon. Acclaimed video game director Hideo Kojima praised the series, devoting specific attention to its use of camera work and framing.

Notes

References

External links
 
  
 

+Ultra
2021 anime ONAs
2022 anime television series debuts
Crunchyroll anime
Cultural depictions of Minamoto no Yoshitsune
Fuji TV original programming
Historical anime and manga
Science Saru